The MaK DE 1002 is a class of 4 axle Bo′Bo′ diesel-electric locomotives built by Maschinenbau Kiel in association with Brown, Boveri & Cie (later ABB Group).

Design and operation
The locomotives are a standard MaK off-centre cab design similar in appearance and power to the contemporary MaK G 1204 BB diesel-hydraulic locomotives, but with an electrical transmission supplied by BBC, (later ABB).

Eight locomotives were built with MTU engines for a variety of German private railway operators.

Sixteen locomotives were built with higher powered MWM engines; five for Köln-Bonner Eisenbahn (KBE), five for Köln-Frechen-Benzelrather Eisenbahn (KFBE), and six for Häfen und Güterverkehr Köln (HGK). All sixteen locomotive became the property of HGK in 1992 on the reorganisation of the Stadtwerke Köln (Cologne city corporation). Since 1992 the HGK locomotives carry the numbers DE 71 to DE 76, DE 81 to DE 86, and DE 91 to 94.

Developments
The Eurotunnel Class 0001 and NS Class 6400 are related diesel electric developments of this type, with additional specific features for the railway customers.

References

External links

Images 

MaK locomotives
Standard gauge locomotives of Germany
Railway locomotives introduced in 1982
Bo′Bo′ locomotives
Diesel-electric locomotives of Germany